Protein kinase C-binding protein 1 is an enzyme that in humans is encoded by the ZMYND8 gene.

The protein encoded by this gene is a receptor for activated C-kinase (RACK) protein. The encoded protein has been shown to bind in vitro to activated protein kinase C beta I. In addition, this protein is a cutaneous T-cell lymphoma-associated antigen. Finally, the protein contains a bromodomain and two zinc fingers, and is thought to be a transcriptional regulator. Multiple transcript variants encoding several different isoforms have been found for this gene.

Model organisms

Model organisms have been used in the study of ZMYND8 function. A conditional knockout mouse line, called Zmynd8tm1a(EUCOMM)Wtsi was generated as part of the International Knockout Mouse Consortium program — a high-throughput mutagenesis project to generate and distribute animal models of disease to interested scientists.

Male and female animals underwent a standardized phenotypic screen to determine the effects of deletion. Twenty one tests were carried out on mutant mice and two significant abnormalities were observed.  Few homozygous mutant embryos were identified during gestation and none survived until weaning. The remaining tests were carried out on heterozygous mutant adult mice; no additional significant abnormalities were observed in these animals.

References

Further reading

Genes mutated in mice